El Oued District is a district of El Oued Province, Algeria. As of the 2008 census, it has a population of 144,775.

Communes

El Oued District consists of two communes:
El Oued
Kouinine

References

Districts of El Oued Province